Articles related to cryptography include:

A
A5/1   •
A5/2   •
ABA digital signature guidelines   •
ABC (stream cipher)   •
Abraham Sinkov   •
Acoustic cryptanalysis   •
Adaptive chosen-ciphertext attack   •
Adaptive chosen plaintext and chosen ciphertext attack   •
Advantage (cryptography)   •
ADFGVX cipher   •
Adi Shamir   •
Advanced Access Content System   •
Advanced Encryption Standard   •
Advanced Encryption Standard process   •
Adversary   •
AEAD block cipher modes of operation   •
Affine cipher   •
Agnes Meyer Driscoll   •
AKA (security)   •
Akelarre (cipher)   •
Alan Turing   •
Alastair Denniston   •
Al Bhed language   •
Alex Biryukov   •
Alfred Menezes   •
Algebraic Eraser   •
Algorithmically random sequence   •
Alice and Bob   •
All-or-nothing transform   •
Alphabetum Kaldeorum   •
Alternating step generator   •
American Cryptogram Association   •
AN/CYZ-10   •
Anonymous publication   •
Anonymous remailer   •
Antoni Palluth   •
Anubis (cipher)   •
Argon2   •
ARIA (cipher)   •
Arlington Hall   •
Arne Beurling   •
Arnold Cipher   •
Array controller based encryption   •
Arthur Scherbius   •
Arvid Gerhard Damm   •
Asiacrypt   •
Atbash   •
Attribute-based encryption   •
Attack model   •
Auguste Kerckhoffs   •
Authenticated encryption   •
Authentication   •
Authorization certificate   •
Autokey cipher   •
Avalanche effect

B
B-Dienst   •
Babington Plot   •
Baby-step giant-step   •
Bacon's cipher   •
Banburismus   •
Bart Preneel   •
BaseKing   •
BassOmatic   •
BATON   •
BB84   •
Beale ciphers   •
BEAR and LION ciphers   •
Beaufort cipher   •
Beaumanor Hall   •
Bent function   •
Berlekamp–Massey algorithm   •
Bernstein v. United States   •
BestCrypt   •
Biclique attack   •
BID/60   •
BID 770   •
Bifid cipher   •
Bill Weisband   •
Binary Goppa code   •
Biometric word list   •
Birthday attack   •
Bit-flipping attack   •
BitTorrent protocol encryption   •
Biuro Szyfrów   •
Black Chamber   •
Blaise de Vigenère   •
Bletchley Park   •
Blind credential   •
Blinding (cryptography)   •
Blind signature   •
Block cipher   •
Block cipher mode of operation   •
Block size (cryptography)   •
Blowfish (cipher)   •
Blum Blum Shub   •
Blum–Goldwasser cryptosystem   •
Bomba (cryptography)   •
Bombe   •
Book cipher   •
Books on cryptography   •
Boomerang attack   •
Boris Hagelin   •
Bouncy Castle (cryptography)   •
Broadcast encryption   •
Bruce Schneier   •
Brute-force attack   •
Brute Force: Cracking the Data Encryption Standard   •
Burrows–Abadi–Needham logic   •
Burt Kaliski

C
C2Net   •
C-36 (cipher machine)   •
C-52 (cipher machine)   •
Caesar cipher   •
Camellia (cipher)   •
CAPICOM   •
Capstone (cryptography)   •
Cardan grille   •
Card catalog (cryptology)   •
Carlisle Adams   •
CAST-128   •
CAST-256   •
Cayley–Purser algorithm   •
CBC-MAC   •
CCM mode   •
CCMP   •
CD-57   •
CDMF   •
Cellular Message Encryption Algorithm   •
Centiban   •
Central Security Service   •
Centre for Applied Cryptographic Research   •
Central Bureau   •
Certicom   •
Certificate authority   •
Certificate-based encryption   •
Certificateless cryptography   •
Certificate revocation list   •
Certificate signing request   •
Certification path validation algorithm   •
Chaffing and winnowing   •
Challenge-Handshake Authentication Protocol   •
Challenge–response authentication   •
Chosen-ciphertext attack   •
Chosen-plaintext attack   •
CIKS-1   •
Cipher disk   •
Cipher runes   •
Cipher security summary   •
CipherSaber   •
Ciphertext expansion   •
Ciphertext indistinguishability   •
Ciphertext-only attack   •
Ciphertext stealing   •
CIPHERUNICORN-A   •
CIPHERUNICORN-E   •
Classical cipher   •
Claude Shannon   •
Claw-free permutation   •
Cleartext   •
CLEFIA   •
Clifford Cocks   •
Clipper chip   •
Clock (cryptography)   •
Clock drift   •
CMVP   •
COCONUT98   •
Codebook   •
Code (cryptography)   •
Code talker   •
Codress message   •
Cold boot attack   •
Collision attack   •
Collision resistance   •
Colossus computer   •
Combined Cipher Machine   •
Commitment scheme   •
Common Scrambling Algorithm   •
Communications security   •
Communications Security Establishment   •
Communication Theory of Secrecy Systems   •
Comparison of disk encryption software   •
Comparison of SSH clients   •
Completeness (cryptography)   •
Complexity trap   •
Computational Diffie–Hellman assumption   •
Computational hardness assumption   •
Computer insecurity   •
Computer and network surveillance   •
COMSEC equipment   •
Conch (SSH)   •
Concrete security   •
Conel Hugh O'Donel Alexander   •
Confidentiality   •
Confusion and diffusion   •
Content-scrambling system   •
Controlled Cryptographic Item   •
Corkscrew (program)   •
Correlation immunity   •
COSIC   •
Covert channel   •
Cover (telecommunications)   •
Crab (cipher)   •
Cramer–Shoup cryptosystem   •
CRAM-MD5   •
CRHF   •
Crib (cryptanalysis)   •
CrossCrypt   •
Crowds (anonymity network)   •
Crypt (C)   •
Cryptanalysis   •
Cryptanalysis of the Enigma   •
Cryptanalysis of the Lorenz cipher   •
Cryptanalytic computer   •
Cryptex   •
Cryptico   •
Crypto AG   •
Crypto-anarchism   •
Crypto API (Linux)   •
Microsoft CryptoAPI   •
CryptoBuddy   •
Cryptochannel   •
CRYPTO (conference)   •
Cryptogram   •
Cryptographically Generated Address   •
Cryptographically secure pseudorandom number generator   •
Cryptographically strong   •
Cryptographic Application Programming Interface   •
Cryptographic hash function   •
Cryptographic key types   •
Cryptographic Message Syntax   •
Cryptographic primitive   •
Cryptographic protocol   •
Cryptographic Service Provider   •
Cryptographie indéchiffrable   •
Cryptography   •
Cryptography in Japan   •
Cryptography newsgroups   •
Cryptography standards   •
Crypto: How the Code Rebels Beat the Government—Saving Privacy in the Digital Age   •
Cryptologia   •
Cryptology ePrint Archive   •
Cryptology Research Society of India   •
Cryptomathic   •
Cryptome   •
Cryptomeria cipher   •
Cryptonomicon   •
CrypTool   •
Crypto phone   •
Crypto-society   •
Cryptosystem   •
Cryptovirology   •
CRYPTREC   •
CS-Cipher   •
Curve25519   • Curve448   • Custom hardware attack   •
Cycles per byte   •
Cyclometer   •
Cypherpunk   •
Cyrillic Projector

D
D'Agapeyeff cipher   •
Daniel J. Bernstein   •
Data Authentication Algorithm   •
Data Encryption Standard   •
Datagram Transport Layer Security   •
David Chaum   •
David Kahn   •
David Naccache   •
David Wagner   •
David Wheeler (computer scientist)   •
Davies attack   •
Davies–Meyer hash   •
DEAL   •
Decipherment   •
Decisional Diffie–Hellman assumption   •
Decorrelation theory   •
Decrypt   •
DeCSS   •
Defence Signals Directorate   •
Degree of anonymity   •
Delegated Path Discovery   •
Delegated Path Validation   •
Deniable encryption   •
Derek Taunt   •
Derived unique key per transaction   •
DES Challenges   •
DES supplementary material   •
DES-X   •
Deterministic encryption   •
DFC (cipher)   •
Dictionary attack   •
Differential cryptanalysis   •
Differential-linear attack   •
Differential power analysis   •
Diffie–Hellman key exchange   •
Diffie–Hellman problem   •
DigiCipher 2   •
Digital Fortress   •
Digital rights management   •
Digital signature   •
Digital Signature Algorithm   •
Digital signature forgery   •
Digital timestamping   •
Digital watermarking   •
Dilly Knox   •
Dining cryptographers problem   •
Diplomatic bag   •
Direct Anonymous Attestation   •
Discrete logarithm   •
Disk encryption   •
Disk encryption hardware   •
Disk encryption software   •
Distance-bounding protocol   •
Distinguishing attack   •
Distributed.net   •
DMA attack   •
dm-crypt   •
Dmitry Sklyarov   •
DomainKeys   •
Don Coppersmith   •
Dorabella Cipher   •
Double Ratchet Algorithm   •
Doug Stinson   •
Dragon (cipher)   •
DRYAD   •
Dual_EC_DRBG   •

E
E0 (cipher)   •
E2 (cipher)   •
E4M   •
EAP-AKA   •
EAP-SIM   •
EAX mode   •
ECC patents   •
ECHELON   •
ECRYPT   •
Edouard Fleissner von Wostrowitz   •
Edward Hebern   •
Edward Scheidt   •
Edward Travis   •
EFF DES cracker   •
Efficient Probabilistic Public-Key Encryption Scheme   •
EKMS   •
Electronic Communications Act 2000   •
Electronic money   •
Electronic signature   •
Electronic voting   •
ElGamal encryption   •
ElGamal signature scheme   •
Eli Biham   •
Elizebeth Friedman   •
Elliptic-curve cryptography   •
Elliptic-curve Diffie–Hellman   •
Elliptic Curve DSA   • EdDSA   • Elliptic curve only hash   •
Elonka Dunin   •
Encrypted function   •
Encrypted key exchange   •
Encrypting File System   •
Encryption   •
Encryption software   •
Enigmail   •
Enigma machine   •
Enigma rotor details   •
Entrust   •
Ernst Fetterlein   •
eSTREAM   •
Étienne Bazeries   •
Eurocrypt   •
EuroCrypt   •
Export of cryptography   •
Extensible Authentication Protocol

F
Fast Software Encryption   •
Fast syndrome-based hash   •
FEA-M   •
FEAL   •
Feige–Fiat–Shamir identification scheme   •
Feistel cipher   •
Félix Delastelle   •
Fialka   •
Filesystem-level encryption   •
FileVault   •
Fill device   •
Financial cryptography   •
FIPS 140   •
FIPS 140-2   •
Firefly (key exchange protocol)   •
FISH (cipher)   •
Fish (cryptography)   •
Floradora   •
Fluhrer, Mantin and Shamir attack   •
Format-preserving encryption   •
Fortezza   •
Fort George G. Meade   •
Fortuna (PRNG)   •
Four-square cipher   •
Franciszek Pokorny   •
Frank A. Stevenson   •
Frank Rowlett   •
Freenet   •
FreeOTFE   •
FreeS/WAN   •
Frequency analysis   •
Friedrich Kasiski   •
Fritz-chip   •
FROG   •
FROSTBURG   •
FTP over SSH   •
Full disk encryption   •
Full Domain Hash   •
F. W. Winterbotham

G
Galois/Counter Mode   •
Gardening (cryptanalysis)   •
GCHQ Bude   •
GCHQ CSO Morwenstow   •
GDES   •
Generic Security Services Application Program Interface   •
George Blakley   •
George Scovell   •
GGH encryption scheme   •
GGH signature scheme   •
Gilbert Vernam   •
GMR (cryptography)   •
GNU Privacy Guard   •
GnuTLS   •
Goldwasser–Micali cryptosystem   •
Gordon Welchman   •
GOST (block cipher)   •
GOST (hash function)   •
Government Communications Headquarters   •
Government Communications Security Bureau   •
Grain (cipher)   •
Grand Cru (cipher)   •
Great Cipher   •
Grill (cryptology)   •
Grille (cryptography)   •
Group-based cryptography   •
Group signature   •
Grover's algorithm   •
Gustave Bertrand   •
Gwido Langer

H
H.235   •
HAIFA construction   •
HAIPE   •
Hans Dobbertin   •
Hans-Thilo Schmidt   •
Hard-core predicate   •
Hardware random number generator   •
Hardware security module   •
Harold Keen   •
Harry Hinsley   •
Harvest (computer)   •
HAS-160   •
Hash-based cryptography   •
Hashcash   •
Hash chain   •
Hash function security summary   •
Hash list   •
Hasty Pudding cipher   •
HAVAL   •
HC-256   •
HC-9   •
Heath Robinson (codebreaking machine)   •
Hebern rotor machine   •
Henri Braquenié   •
Henryk Zygalski   •
Herbert Yardley   •
Hidden Field Equations   •
Hideki Imai   •
Hierocrypt   •
High-bandwidth Digital Content Protection   •
Higher-order differential cryptanalysis   •
Hill cipher   •
History of cryptography   •
HMAC   •
HMAC-based One-time Password algorithm   (HOTP) •
Horst Feistel   •
Howard Heys   •
Https   •
Hugo Hadwiger   •
Hugo Koch   •
Hushmail   •
Hut 6   •
Hut 8   •
HX-63   •
Hybrid cryptosystem   •
Hyperelliptic curve cryptography   •
Hyper-encryption

I
Ian Goldberg   •
IBM 4758   •
ICE (cipher)   •
ID-based cryptography   •
IDEA NXT   •
Identification friend or foe   •
IEEE 802.11i   •
IEEE P1363   •
I. J. Good   •
Illegal prime   •
Impossible differential cryptanalysis   •
Index of coincidence   •
Indifferent chosen-ciphertext attack   •
Indistinguishability obfuscation   •
Indocrypt   •
Information leakage   •
Information Security Group   •
Information-theoretic security   •
Initialization vector   •
Integer factorization   •
Integral cryptanalysis   •
Integrated Encryption Scheme   •
Integrated Windows Authentication   •
Interlock protocol   •
Intermediate certificate authorities   •
International Association for Cryptologic Research   •
International Data Encryption Algorithm   •
Internet Key Exchange   •
Internet Security Association and Key Management Protocol   •
Interpolation attack   •
Invisible ink   •
IPsec   •
Iraqi block cipher   •
ISAAC (cipher)   •
ISO 19092-2   •
ISO/IEC 9797   •
Ivan Damgård

J
Jacques Stern   •
JADE (cypher machine)   •
James Gillogly   •
James H. Ellis   •
James Massey   •
Jan Graliński   •
Jan Kowalewski   •
Japanese naval codes   •
Java Cryptography Architecture   •
Jefferson disk   •
Jennifer Seberry   •
Jerzy Różycki   •
Joan Daemen   •
Johannes Trithemius   •
John Herivel   •
John Kelsey (cryptanalyst)   •
John R. F. Jeffreys   •
John Tiltman   •
Jon Lech Johansen   •
Josef Pieprzyk   •
Joseph Desch   •
Joseph Finnegan (cryptographer)   •
Joseph Mauborgne   •
Joseph Rochefort   •
Journal of Cryptology   •
Junger v. Daley

K
Kaisa Nyberg   •
Kalyna (cipher)   •
Kasiski examination   •
KASUMI   •
KCDSA   •
KeePass   •
Kerberos (protocol)   •
Kerckhoffs's principle   •
Kevin McCurley (cryptographer)   •
Key-agreement protocol   •
Key authentication   •
Key clustering   •
Key (cryptography)   •
Key derivation function   •
Key distribution center   •
Key escrow   •
Key exchange   •
Keyfile   •
Key generation   •
Key generator   •
Key management   •
Key-recovery attack   •
Key schedule   •
Key server (cryptographic)   •
Key signature (cryptography)   •
Keysigning   •
Key signing party   •
Key size   •
Key space (cryptography)   •
Keystream   •
Key stretching   •
Key whitening   •
KG-84   •
KHAZAD   •
Khufu and Khafre   •
Kiss (cryptanalysis)   •
KL-43   •
KL-51   •
KL-7   •
Kleptography   •
KN-Cipher   •
Knapsack problem   •
Known-key distinguishing attack   •
Known-plaintext attack   •
KnownSafe   •
KOI-18   •
KOV-14   •
Kryha   •
Kryptos   •
KSD-64   •
Kupyna   •
Kuznyechik   •
KW-26   •
KW-37   •
KY-3   •
KY-57   •
KY-58   •
KY-68   •
KYK-13

L
Lacida   •
Ladder-DES   •
Lamport signature   •
Lars Knudsen   •
Lattice-based cryptography   •
Laurance Safford   •
Lawrie Brown   •
LCS35   •
Leo Marks   •
Leonard Adleman   •
Leon Battista Alberti   •
Leo Rosen   •
Leslie Yoxall   •
LEVIATHAN (cipher)   •
LEX (cipher)   •
Libelle (cipher)   •
Linear cryptanalysis   •
Linear-feedback shift register   •
Link encryption   •
List of ciphertexts   •
List of cryptographers   •
List of cryptographic file systems   •
List of cryptographic key types   •
List of cryptology conferences   •
List of telecommunications encryption terms   • List of people associated with Bletchley Park • 
  List of SFTP clients   •
List of SFTP server software   •
LOKI   •
LOKI97   •
Lorenz cipher   •
Louis W. Tordella   •
Lsh   •
Lucifer (cipher)   •
Lyra2

M
M6 (cipher)   •
M8 (cipher)   •
M-209   •
M-325   •
M-94   •
MacGuffin (cipher)   •
Madryga   •
MAGENTA   •
Magic (cryptography)   •
Maksymilian Ciężki   •
Malcolm J. Williamson   •
Malleability (cryptography)   •
Man-in-the-middle attack   •
Marian Rejewski   •
MARS (cryptography)   •
Martin Hellman   •
MaruTukku   •
Massey–Omura cryptosystem   •
Matt Blaze   •
Matt Robshaw   •
Max Newman   •
McEliece cryptosystem   •
mcrypt   •
MD2 (cryptography)   •
MD4   •
MD5   •
MD5CRK   •
MDC-2   •
MDS matrix   •
Mean shortest distance   •
Meet-in-the-middle attack   •
Mental poker   •
Mercury (cipher machine)   •
Mercy (cipher)   •
Meredith Gardner   •
Merkle signature scheme   •
Merkle–Damgård construction   •
Merkle–Hellman knapsack cryptosystem   •
Merkle's Puzzles   •
Merkle tree   •
MESH (cipher)   •
Message authentication   •
Message authentication code   •
Message forgery   •
MI8   •
Michael Luby   •
MICKEY   •
Microdot   •
Military Cryptanalysis (book) (William F. Friedman)   •
Military Cryptanalytics   •
Mimic function   •
Mirror writing   •
MISTY1   •
Mitsuru Matsui   •
MMB (cipher)   •
Mod n cryptanalysis   •
MQV   •
MS-CHAP   •
MUGI   •
MULTI-S01   •
MultiSwap   •
Multivariate cryptography

N
National Communications Centre   •
National Cryptologic Museum   •
National Security Agency   •
National Cipher Challenge   •
Navajo I   •
Neal Koblitz   •
Needham–Schroeder protocol   •
Negligible function   •
NEMA (machine)   •
NESSIE   •
Network Security Services   •
Neural cryptography   •
New Data Seal   •
NewDES   •
N-Hash   •
Nicolas Courtois   •
Niederreiter cryptosystem   •
Niels Ferguson   •
Nigel de Grey   •
Nihilist cipher   •
Nikita Borisov   •
Nimbus (cipher)   •
NIST hash function competition   •
Nonlinear-feedback shift register   •
NOEKEON   •
Non-malleable codes   •
Noreen   •
Nothing up my sleeve number   •
NSA cryptography   •
NSA encryption systems   •
NSA in fiction   •
NSAKEY   •
NSA Suite A Cryptography   •
NSA Suite B Cryptography   •
NT LAN Manager   •
NTLMSSP   •
NTRUEncrypt   •
NTRUSign   •
Null cipher   •
Numbers station   •
NUSH   •
NTRU

O
Oblivious transfer   •
OCB mode   •
Oded Goldreich   •
Off-the-Record Messaging   •
Okamoto–Uchiyama cryptosystem   •
OMI cryptograph   •
OMNI (SCIP)   •
One-key MAC   •
One-time pad   •
One-time password   •
One-way compression function   •
One-way function   •
Onion routing   •
Online Certificate Status Protocol   •
OP-20-G   •
OpenPGP card   •
OpenSSH   •
OpenSSL   •
Openswan   •
OpenVPN   •
Operation Ruthless   •
Optimal asymmetric encryption padding   •
Over the Air Rekeying   (OTAR) •
OTFE   •
Otway–Rees protocol

P
Padding (cryptography)   •
Padding oracle attack    •
Paillier cryptosystem   •
Pairing-based cryptography   •
Panama (cryptography)   •
Partitioning cryptanalysis   •
Passive attack   •
Passphrase   •
Password   •
Password-authenticated key agreement   •
Password cracking   •
Password Hashing Competition   •
Paul Kocher   •
Paulo Pancatuccio   •
Paulo S. L. M. Barreto   •
Paul van Oorschot   •
PBKDF2   •
PC Bruno   •
Pepper (cryptography)   •
Perfect forward secrecy   •
Perforated sheets   •
Permutation cipher   •
Peter Gutmann (computer scientist)   •
Peter Junger   •
Peter Twinn   •
PGP Corporation   •
PGPDisk   •
PGPfone   •
Phelix   •
Phil Zimmermann   •
Photuris (protocol)   •
Physical security   •
Physical unclonable function   •
Pig Latin   •
Pigpen cipher   •
Pike (cipher)   •
Piling-up lemma   •
Pinwheel (cryptography)   •
Piotr Smoleński   •
Pirate decryption   •
PKC (conference)   •
PKCS   •
PKCS 11   •
PKCS 12   •
PKIX   •
Plaintext   •
Plaintext-aware encryption   •
Playfair cipher   •
Plugboard   •
PMAC (cryptography)   •
Poem code   •
Pohlig–Hellman algorithm   •
Point-to-Point Tunneling Protocol   •
Pointcheval–Stern signature algorithm   •
Poly1305   •
Polyalphabetic cipher   •
Polybius square   •
Portex   •
Post-quantum cryptography   •
Post-Quantum Cryptography Standardization   •
Power analysis   •
Preimage attack   •
Pre-shared key   •
Pretty Good Privacy   •
Printer steganography   •
Privacy-enhanced Electronic Mail   •
Private Communications Technology   •
Private information retrieval   •
Probabilistic encryption   •
Product cipher   •
Proof-of-work system   •
Protected Extensible Authentication Protocol   •
Provable security   •
Provably secure cryptographic hash function   •
Proxy re-encryption   •
Pseudo-Hadamard transform   •
Pseudonymity   •
Pseudorandom function   •
Pseudorandom number generator   •
Pseudorandom permutation   •
Public key certificate   •
Public-key cryptography   •
Public key fingerprint   •
Public key infrastructure   •
PURPLE   •
PuTTY   •
Py (cipher)

Q
Q (cipher)   •
Qrpff   •
QUAD (cipher)   •
Quadratic sieve   •
Quantum coin flipping   •
Quantum cryptography   •
Quantum digital signature   •
Quantum fingerprinting   •
Quantum key distribution

R
Rabbit (cipher)   •
Rabin cryptosystem   •
Rabin–Williams encryption   •
RadioGatún   •
Rail fence cipher   •
Rainbow table   •
Ralph Merkle   •
Rambutan (cryptography)   •
Random function   •
Randomness tests   •
Random number generator attack   •
Random oracle   •
RC2   •
RC4   •
RC5   •
RC6   •
Rebound attack   •
Reciprocal cipher   •
Red/black concept   •
REDOC   •
Red Pike (cipher)   •
Reflector (cipher machine)   •
Regulation of Investigatory Powers Act 2000   •
Reihenschieber   •
Rekeying (cryptography)   •
Related-key attack   •
Replay attack   •
Reservehandverfahren   •
Residual block termination   •
Rijndael key schedule   •
Rijndael S-box   •
Ring signature   •
RIPEMD   •
Rip van Winkle cipher   •
Robert Morris (cryptographer)   •
Robot certificate authority   •
Rockex   •
Rolf Noskwith   •
Ron Rivest   •
Room 40   •
Root certificate   •
Ross J. Anderson   •
Rossignols   •
ROT13   •
Rotor machine   •
RSA RSA •
RSA-100   •
RSA-1024   •
RSA-110   •
RSA-120   •
RSA-129   •
RSA-130   •
RSA-140   •
RSA-150   •
RSA-1536   •
RSA-155   •
RSA-160   •
RSA-170   •
RSA-180   •
RSA-190   •
RSA-200   •
RSA-2048   •
RSA-210   •
RSA-220   •
RSA-230   •
RSA-232   •
RSA-240   •
RSA-250   •
RSA-260   •
RSA-270   •
RSA-280   •
RSA-290   •
RSA-300   •
RSA-309   •
RSA-310   •
RSA-320   •
RSA-330   •
RSA-340   •
RSA-350   •
RSA-360   •
RSA-370   •
RSA-380   •
RSA-390   •
RSA-400   •
RSA-410   •
RSA-420   •
RSA-430   •
RSA-440   •
RSA-450   •
RSA-460   •
RSA-470   •
RSA-480   •
RSA-490   •
RSA-500   •
RSA-576   •
RSA-617   •
RSA-640   •
RSA-704   •
RSA-768   •
RSA-896   •
RSA-PSS   •
RSA Factoring Challenge   •
RSA problem   •
RSA Secret-Key Challenge   •
RSA Security   •
Rubber-hose cryptanalysis   •
Running key cipher   •
Russian copulation

S
S-1 block cipher   •
SAFER   •
Salsa20   •
Salt (cryptography)   •
SAM card   •
Security Support Provider Interface   •
SAML   •
SAVILLE   •
SC2000   •
Schnorr group   •
Schnorr signature   •
Schoof–Elkies–Atkin algorithm   •
SCIP   •
Scott Vanstone   •
Scrambler   •
Scramdisk   •
Scream (cipher)   •
Scrypt   •
Scytale   •
Seahorse (software)   •
SEAL (cipher)   •
Sean Murphy (cryptographer)   •
SECG   •
Secret broadcast   •
Secret decoder ring   •
Secrets and Lies (Schneier)   •
Secret sharing   •
Sectéra Secure Module   •
Secure access module   •
Secure channel   •
Secure Communication based on Quantum Cryptography   •
Secure copy   •
Secure cryptoprocessor   •
Secure Electronic Transaction   •
Secure Hash Algorithms   •
Secure Hypertext Transfer Protocol   •
Secure key issuing cryptography   •
Secure multi-party computation   •
Secure Neighbor Discovery   •
Secure Real-time Transport Protocol   •
Secure remote password protocol   •
Secure Shell   •
Secure telephone   •
Secure Terminal Equipment   •
Secure voice   •
SecurID   •
Security association   •
Security engineering   •
Security level   •
Security parameter   •
Security protocol notation   •
Security through obscurity   •
Security token   •
SEED   •
Selected Areas in Cryptography   •
Self-certifying File System   •
Self-shrinking generator   •
Self-signed certificate   •
Semantic security   •
Serge Vaudenay   •
Serpent (cipher)   •
Session key   •
SHACAL   •
Shafi Goldwasser   •
SHA-1   •
SHA-2   •
SHA-3   •
Shared secret   •
SHARK   •
Shaun Wylie   •
Shor's algorithm   •
Shrinking generator   •
Shugborough inscription   •
Side-channel attack   •
Siemens and Halske T52   •
SIGABA   •
SIGCUM   •
SIGINT   •
Signal Protocol   •
Signal Intelligence Service   •
Signcryption   •
SIGSALY   •
SILC (protocol)   •
Silvio Micali   •
Simple Authentication and Security Layer   •
Simple public-key infrastructure   •
Simple XOR cipher   •
S/KEY   •
Skein (hash function)   •
Skipjack (cipher)   •
Slide attack   •
Slidex   •
Small subgroup confinement attack   •
S/MIME   •
SM4 algorithm   (formerly SMS4) •
Snake oil (cryptography)   •
Snefru   •
SNOW   •
Snuffle   •
SOBER-128   •
Solitaire (cipher)   •
Solomon Kullback   •
SOSEMANUK   •
Special Collection Service   •
Spectr-H64   •
SPEKE (cryptography)   •
Sponge function   •
SPNEGO   •
Square (cipher)   •
Ssh-agent   • Ssh-keygen   • SSH File Transfer Protocol   •
SSLeay   •
Stafford Tavares   •
Standard model (cryptography)   •
Station CAST   •
Station HYPO   •
Station-to-Station protocol   •
Statistical cryptanalysis   •
Stefan Lucks   •
Steganalysis   •
Steganography   •
Straddling checkerboard   •
Stream cipher   •
Stream cipher attacks   •
Strong cryptography   •
Strong RSA assumption   •
Stuart Milner-Barry   •
STU-II   •
STU-III   •
Stunnel   •
Substitution box   •
Substitution cipher   •
Substitution–permutation network   •
Superencryption   •
Supersingular isogeny key exchange   •
Swedish National Defence Radio Establishment   •
SWIFFT   •
SXAL/MBAL   •
Symmetric-key algorithm   •
SYSKEY

T
Tabula recta   •
Taher Elgamal   •
Tamper resistance   •
Tcpcrypt   •
Television encryption   •
TEMPEST   •
Template:Cryptographic software   •
Temporal Key Integrity Protocol   •
Testery   •
Thawte   •
The Alphabet Cipher   •
The Code Book   •
The Codebreakers   •
The Gold-Bug   •
The Magic Words are Squeamish Ossifrage   •
Theory of Cryptography Conference   •
The world wonders   •
Thomas Jakobsen   •
Three-pass protocol   •
Threshold shadow scheme   •
TICOM   •
Tiger (cryptography)   •
Timeline of cryptography   •
Time/memory/data tradeoff attack   •
Time-based One-time Password algorithm   (TOTP) •
Timing attack   •
Tiny Encryption Algorithm   •
Tom Berson   •
Tommy Flowers   •
Topics in cryptography   •
Tor (anonymity network)   •
Torus-based cryptography   •
Traffic analysis   •
Traffic-flow security   •
Traitor tracing   •
Transmission security   •
Transport Layer Security   •
Transposition cipher   •
Trapdoor function   •
Trench code   •
Treyfer   •
Trifid cipher   •
Triple DES   •
Trivium (cipher)   •
TrueCrypt   •
Truncated differential cryptanalysis   •
Trusted third party   •
Turing (cipher)   •
TWINKLE   •
TWIRL   •
Twofish   •
Two-square cipher   •
Type 1 encryption   •
Type 2 encryption   •
Type 3 encryption   •
Type 4 encryption   •
Typex

U
UES (cipher)   •
Ultra   •
UMAC   •
Unbalanced Oil and Vinegar   •
Undeniable signature   •
Unicity distance   •
Universal composability   •
Universal one-way hash function   (UOWHF)

V
Venona project   •
Verifiable secret sharing   •
Verisign   •
Very smooth hash   •
VEST   •
VIC cipher   •
VideoCrypt   •
Vigenère cipher   •
Vincent Rijmen   •
VINSON   •
Virtual private network   •
Visual cryptography   •
Voynich manuscript

W
Wadsworth's cipher   •
WAKE   •
WLAN Authentication and Privacy Infrastructure   •
Watermark (data file)   •
Watermarking attack   •
Weak key   •
Web of trust   •
Whirlpool (hash function)   •
Whitfield Diffie   •
Wide Mouth Frog protocol   •
Wi-Fi Protected Access   •
William F. Friedman   •
William Montgomery (cryptographer)   •
WinSCP   •
Wired Equivalent Privacy   •
Wireless Transport Layer Security   •
Witness-indistinguishable proof   •
Workshop on Cryptographic Hardware and Embedded Systems   •
World War I cryptography   •
World War II cryptography   •
W. T. Tutte

X
X.509   •
XDH assumption   •
Xiaoyun Wang   •
XML Encryption   •
XML Signature   •
xmx   •
XSL attack   •
XTEA   •
XTR   •
Xuejia Lai   •
XXTEA  
10-00-00-00-00

Y
Yarrow algorithm   •
Y-stations   •
Yuliang Zheng

Z
Zeroisation   •
Zero-knowledge password proof   •
Zero-knowledge proof   •
Zfone   •
Zodiac (cipher)   •
ZRTP   •
Zimmermann–Sassaman key-signing protocol   •
Zimmermann Telegram

See also

 Outline of cryptography – an analytical list of articles and terms.
 Books on cryptography – an annotated list of suggested readings.
 List of cryptographers – an annotated list of cryptographers.
 Important publications in cryptography – some cryptography papers in computer science.
 WikiProject Cryptography – discussion and resources for editing cryptography articles.

Cryptography lists and comparisons
Cryptography
Cryptography